Alan Garside (29 September 1926 – 23 May 2021) was an Australian soccer player who played as a forward for Granville and the Australian national team. He received a cap for his appearance and a 2020–2021 Socceroos jersey with his name on the back.

International career
Garside played his first and only international match against South Africa on 1 October 1955.

Honours
Granville
 NSW Division One South Premiership: 1952

References

1926 births
2021 deaths
Association football forwards
Australia international soccer players
Australian soccer players
Soccer players from Sydney